The Ghost & Mrs. Muir is a situation comedy that aired on NBC during 1968–1969 and ABC during 1969–1970. The series starred Hope Lange and Edward Mulhare in the title roles; Lange's work was recognized twice with an Emmy Award, once for each season.

Series overview

Episodes

Season 1 (1968–69)

Season 2 (1969–70)

External links
 

Lists of fantasy television series episodes
Lists of American sitcom episodes